The Dancefloor Chart (originally the Dance Floor Chart Show) is a chart show on MTV Europe that played the ten most popular dance songs in Europe. It plays all different kinds of genres, from trance to house, garage to techno, breakbeat to drum and bass etc. It used to be a top 20 chart, but was reduced to a top 10 in 2004. The show was cancelled in July 2010 but continued to be broadcast on MTV Europe with a different compilation method up until its termination in August 2012.

As of January 1, 2013 the Dancefloor chart is back on MTV Europe - Every Tuesday.

The show would also air in the UK on MTV UK and MTV Dance, although usually featuring a different chart. It has more recently been replaced with The Official Dance Chart.

External links
 MTV Europe: Dancefloor Chart

MTV original programming
Music chart television shows